Juan Depetris (born 26 March 1998) is an Argentine professional footballer who plays as a midfielder.

Career
Depetris began his senior career with Nueva Chicago, who signed him from Argentinos Juniors in 2016. Depetris was promoted into their senior squad in July 2017, the final month of 2016–17, to be an unused substitute for fixtures with Argentinos Juniors, his ex-club, and Instituto, prior to being selected for his professional bow on 28 July 2017 versus San Martín; being subbed on for Norberto Palmieri. Depetris departed at the end of 2018, subsequently having stints with regional sides Defensores de Salto and Roma de Tigre.

Career statistics
.

References

External links

1998 births
Living people
Place of birth missing (living people)
Argentine footballers
Association football midfielders
Primera Nacional players
Nueva Chicago footballers